The Zedriv GC1 is an electric 5-door city car made by Zedriv. It is essentially the 5-door variant of the Zedriv GC2.

Overview

The Zedriv GC1 was shown alongside the GC2 and GX5 at the 2019 Auto Shanghai. It has dimensions of 3710 mm/1675 mm/1535 mm, a wheelbase of 2500 mm, a ground clearance of 120 mm, and a weight of 1130 kg. The Zedriv GC1 has 5 doors and 4 seats and went into production in 2020 costing ¥68,800 to ¥83,800.

Performance
The Zedriv GC1 has a range of 211 miles, 74 horsepower, 36.2 kWh battery, FWD, 120 km/h top speed, and a 50km/h acceleration in 4.2 seconds.

Design

The design of Zedriv vehicles was done under the lead of their design chief, Lorenz Bittner, in Shanghai.

See also
Zedriv GC2
Zedriv GT3
Zedriv GX5

References

External links
Official website

Cars introduced in 2019
Cars of China
Hatchbacks
Zedriv
Production electric cars